Elections were held in the Regional Municipality of Durham of Ontario on October 25, 2010 in conjunction with municipal elections across the province.

Durham Regional Council

Plebiscite
Are you in favour of the Council of the Regional Municipality of Durham passing the necessary resolutions and by-laws to change the method of selecting its Chair from appointment by the members of Regional Council to election by general vote of all electors in the Region?

Ajax
The following are the official results for the Town of Ajax.

Mayor

Brock
Larry O'Connor, the incumbent mayor of Brock, was reelected by a margin of just 13 votes over challenger Terry Clayton, who had previously been mayor of the township from 2000 to 2003. The narrow margin resulted in an ongoing judicial recount battle; the township used a mail-in voting system in 2010, and when ballots which were postmarked before election day but arrived late were counted, O'Connor's margin of victory was reduced to just three votes.

O'Connor voluntarily resigned as mayor on March 28, 2011, and the township council subsequently appointed Clayton as the new mayor.

Clarington
The following are the official results for the Municipality of Clarington.

Mayor

Regional Councillors
Two Regional Councillors were elected in 1 of 2 wards.

Local Councillors
Four Local Councillors were elected in 1 of 4 wards.

Oshawa

Pickering

Scugog

Uxbridge

Whitby

References 

2010 Ontario municipal elections
Politics of the Regional Municipality of Durham